Sybren Klazes Sybrandi (1772, Leeuwarden – 17 June, 1854, Haarlem) was a Dutch Mennonite teacher and minister.

He was trained at the Amsterdam Mennonite seminary and first served in  Nijmegen 1805-1807 before moving to Haarlem where he became the father of the Sybrandi family of Haarlem Mennonites. Sybrandi served in Haarlem in the church and the Algemeene Doopsgezinde Sociëteit (ADS) until retirement in 1849. From 1812 he was also a member of the Teylers First Society. He retired in 1827 to become a director of Teylers Stichting. His son Klaas Sybrandi later also filled these positions.

References

1772 births
1854 deaths
People from Leeuwarden
Clergy from Haarlem
Dutch Mennonites
Members of Teylers Eerste Genootschap
Mennonite ministers
Directors of Teylers Stichting
19th-century Anabaptist ministers